Graeme William Lyall (AM), is an Australian saxophonist, composer and arranger. He became a Member of the Order of Australia on 26 January 2003: "For service to music as Artistic Director of the Western Australian Youth Jazz Orchestra, and as a musical director, composer and performer."

Biography
Lyall played professionally at the Palais Ballroom and The Embers night club in Melbourne when he was 17 years old. When he turned 19 he was appointed to a lead musician's role and arranger with TCN 9 Orchestra. In 1971, Lyall took a composing, arranging and record production role at Armstrong Studios and moved back to Melbourne. He became a member of the ABC Melbourne Showband for years in 1977 and finally become the Director of Music at GTV-9 Melbourne, including work on the Don Lane Show. During his time in Melbourne, Graeme was the Winner of the Best Arrangement at Yamaha International Song Festival four times and winner of the Australian Writers and Art Directors Guild Award for the Best Music for a Television Commercial (Hallmark Greeting Cards). He appears on recordings by John Sangster and Tony Gould.

He is the 2015 inductee into the Bell Awards Hall of Fame.

He became a Member of the Order of Australia on 26 January 2003, "For service to music as Artistic Director of the Western Australian Youth Jazz Orchestra, and as a musical director, composer and performer."

He currently lives in Mount Gambier.

Generations in Jazz

Graeme was the Division 2 adjudicator at Generations in Jazz, an annual festival that provides an opportunity for High School big bands from around Australia to compete against each other and for students to hear live performances from the likes of, John Morrison, Ross Irwin and several others.

Discography

Albums

Awards and nominations

ARIA Music Awards
The ARIA Music Awards is an annual awards ceremony that recognises excellence, innovation, and achievement across all genres of Australian music. They commenced in 1987. 

! 
|-
| 2007
| Smokingun (with Joe Chindamo)
| Best Jazz Album
| 
| 
|-
| 2014
| The Hunters & Pointers (with John Hoffman, Tony Gould, Ben Robertson, Tony Floyd)
| Best Jazz Album
| 
| 
|-

References

External links
Move Records
Graeme Lyall official website

1942 births
Living people
Australian jazz saxophonists
Male saxophonists
Australian music arrangers
21st-century saxophonists
21st-century Australian male musicians
21st-century Australian musicians
Male jazz musicians
Daly-Wilson Big Band members